Jae Kingi-Cross (born 20 January 1976) is a former Australian women's basketball player.

Biography

Kingi-Cross was a member of the national team roster for 12 years, from 1995-2006 and was in the squad that won a bronze medal at the 2002 World Championships held in China. Pregnancy kept Kingi-Cross out of the 2004 Olympic squad that went to Athens.

In the domestic Women's National Basketball League (WNBL) Kingi-Cross played 192 games for the Australian Institute of Sport and the Adelaide Lightning. Kingi-Cross was also twice named to the WNBL All-Star Five, in seasons 2000/01 and 2001/02.

In 2001, Kingi-Cross moved to the United States to play in the Women's National Basketball Association where she was selected in the second round (pick 22 overall) of the 2001 WNBA Draft by  the Detroit Shock. Kingi-Cross also played with the Phoenix Mercury (2004), the San Antonio Silver Stars (2006) and the Houston Comets (2007). Entering the 2006 World Championship held in Brazil, Kingi-Cross was the only Australian playing in the WNBA who was not selected in the Opals team.

In 2008, she was inducted into her home town of Canberra's Sports Hall of Fame. Kingi-Cross and her husband, Tom Cross, live in Houston with their four daughters, where she is the head coach for the University of St. Thomas (Texas).

See also
 List of Australian WNBA players

References

1976 births
Living people
Australian expatriate basketball people in the United States
Australian Institute of Sport basketball (WNBL) players
Australian people of Māori descent
Australian women's basketball players
Basketball players at the 2006 Commonwealth Games
Commonwealth Games gold medallists for Australia
Commonwealth Games medallists in basketball
Detroit Shock players
Phoenix Mercury players
San Antonio Stars players
Medallists at the 2006 Commonwealth Games